Thiri Pyanchi Min Sein  (formerly, Hoe Min Sein; 26 December 18989 November 1978) was a Burmese physician, educator and administrator. The first Burmese dean of the Faculty of Medicine of Rangoon University in British Burma, Min Sein was one of the small group of senior physicians that rebuilt and expanded the country's medical education system from the ground up after the country's independence in 1948. He served as the dean of the medical school four times between 1947 and 1959, and led the Burma Medical Research Institute, the Burma Medical Association and the Burma Olympic Committee.

Early life and education

He was born Hoe Min Sein to landowner parents U Sine Hu and Daw Yin Cane on 26 December 1898 in Pyapon in the Irrawaddy delta in British Burma. He went to high school in Rangoon (Yangon), and studied medicine at the University of Calcutta, and graduated with an MB in 1925. He continued his studies at Guy's Hospital, London from 1927 to 1930, as a clinical assistant to Sir John Conybeare and Sir Charles Symonds. In 1929, he received his MRCP certification from the Royal College of Physicians, and his MRCS from the Royal College of Surgeons of England.

Career

Colonial era
Upon return to Burma, Hoe joined the Indian Medical Service, the military medical service of British India on 27 April 1931. He joined the service right before the outbreak of an open rebellion by Burmese peasants hit hard by the Great Depression. He served as a battalion medical officer with the British Forces throughout the rebellion (1931–1932). His rank in 1932 was captain, and he was assigned to work for the government of Burma by the IMS on 26 February 1934. He became a lecturer in medicine at Rangoon Medical College in 1938, a major on 20 July 1939, and the Medical Superintendent (Head) of Rangoon General Hospital in 1940.

His career achievements were significant in colonial Burma. The colonial era medical community was mainly made up of foreign-born physicians and specialists that existed primarily in Rangoon (Yangon). Indeed, in 1942, he was one of the only four Burmese officers (alongside Lt. Col. Henry Aung Khin, Lt. Col. Alfred Ba Thaw and Capt. Shwe Zan) in the Burma Medical Service (BMS), the successor of the IMS in Burma. (To be sure, some highly qualified Burmese physicians like his own wife Yin May or his RGH colleague Ba Than, both of whom were already FRCS surgeons, did not join the IMS. Yin May did join the BMS after the war in 1946 as a Lt. Col. to run the Lady Dufferin Maternity Hospital.)

Hoe left Burma with the British administration to India during the Japanese occupation of Burma (1942–1945). He was part of the exodus of medical professionals that evacuated the country along with the British administration. His wife remained in Burma, and ended up founding and running the main maternity hospital in Rangoon throughout the war years. (Hoe, Yin May and their son fled Rangoon in early 1942 to escape the invasion but the family somehow got separated in Upper Burma. He made it to India but his pregnant wife returned to Rangoon alone.) He served in the 14th Army from 1942 to 1946 as an Assistant Director, Medical Services (ADMS) and Deputy Director, Medical Services (DDMS).

He returned with the British after the war. When the British restarted Rangoon Medical College as the Faculty of Medicine of Rangoon University in 1946, he became the Professor of Medicine (i.e. Head of the Department). In 1947, Min Sein, as he was known now, became the first ever Burmese dean of the medical school, succeeding the Faculty's first dean Dr. William Burridge. He was awarded the title of OBE by the British government in 1947, and promoted to the rank of Lt. Col. (although he is commonly, if imprecisely, referred to as Col. Min Sein in Burmese publications.) Furthermore, he did not quit the IMS until 1948.

Post-independence

After the country's independence in 1948, Min Sein was one of the few physicians left in the country. His post-independence career centered on rebuilding and expanding the country's medical education system. He was instrumental in restarting the medical school after the war. After independence, Min Sein and Ba Than took turns being the dean of the medical school for the next 11 years. Ba Than served three terms: 1948–1949, 1951–1953, and 1955–1957 while Min Sein served three more terms: 1949–1951, 1953–1955, and 1957–1959, (in addition to his 1947–1948 term before independence.) Min Sein also served as the Professor of Medicine from 1946 to 1959. Under their leadership, the country produced 532 MBBS graduates between 1948 and 1957 in comparison to the 543 graduates between 1922 and 1941 during the colonial era.

Min Sein also represented the country on several occasions. He was a member of or leader of the country's missions to the UK, the US (1952), the USSR (1954) and Japan (1958). From 1956 to 1958, he was a member of the Expert Committee on Maternal and Child Health of the WHO, and a member of the Technical and Scientific committee, WHO. He also took on several roles in various national associations ranging from the Burma Medical Association (president, 1955–1956), the National Health Council, the National Fitness Council, and the Burma Olympic Committee (1948) to the Opium Enquiry Commission and the Racing Enquiry Commission. He was also president of the Britain-Burma Society, vice-president of the Burma Veterans League, and president of the Burma Medical Research Institute.

He retired from his twin roles as the Dean of the medical school and Professor of Medicine in 1959. He was succeeded by Maung Gale as dean, and Shwe Zan as Professor of Medicine. He received his FRCP fellowship from the Royal College Physicians at the end of his career in 1959. For his services, he was awarded the title of Thiri Pyanchi by the Burmese government in 1949. He also received his CBE title from the British government by 1970.

Personal life
He married Yin May in 1936. Yin May was the first Burmese obstetrician and gynecologist, and the first person to perform the Caesarian section in British Burma as well as the first Burmese ever to become a fellow in three different disciplines. The couple had a son and a daughter, including Thein Htut, a gastroenterologist, as well as an adopted son, Mya Thein Han, who went on to become the director of Myanmar Army Medical Corps.

Min Sein was a lifelong sports enthusiast. He was a Guy's Hospital tennis Blue; inter-collegiate long jump champion, Calcutta; president of the Burma Olympic Association, 1948, and captain of the Burma Golf Club. He was president of the Burma National Amateur Athletic Federation, and also of the Weight Lifting and Body Culture Federation, and director and steward of the Rangoon Turf Club.

Min Sein died on 9 November 1978, six weeks after his wife's death on 29 September 1978. He was 79.

Notes

References

Bibliography
 
 
 
 
 
 
 
 
 
 
 
 
 
 
 
 
 
 
 
 
 
 
 

20th-century Burmese physicians
People from Ayeyarwady Region
1898 births
1978 deaths
Fellows of the Royal College of Physicians
Burmese people of Chinese descent
Recipients of the Thiri Pyanchi